The Maine Democratic Party is the affiliate of the Democratic Party in the U.S. state of Maine.

After the Civil War, Democrats were a minor player in a political scene dominated by the Republican Party. However, during the 1950s, Edmund Muskie led an expansive political insurgency culminating in his election as Governor of Maine and successive Democratic elections to both state and national offices.

From 2012 to 2019, despite having a Republican governor in Paul LePage, the party remained strong, holding key offices in the state government and the U.S. Congress and maintaining a majority in the Maine House of Representatives for six of LePage's eight years in office. It is currently the state's favored party, controlling both houses of the state legislature, governorship, and both of Maine's U.S. House seats. One of Maine's U.S. Senate seats is currently held by Angus King, an Independent who caucuses with the Democrats.

Current Democratic officeholders

Members of Congress

U.S. Senate
None

Maine's U.S. Senate Class I seat has been held by Independent Angus King since 2012 (though King does caucus with the Senate Democrats) while the Class II seat has been held by Republican Susan Collins since 1996. Senate Majority Leader George J. Mitchell was the last Democrat to represent Maine in the U.S. Senate. Appointed in May 1980 to fill the vacancy left by Edmund Muskie after Muskie's appointment as the U.S. Secretary of State, Mitchell was subsequently elected to a full term in 1982. After winning a second term in 1988, Mitchell opted to retire instead of seeking a third term. Congressman Thomas Andrews ran as the Democratic nominee in the 1994 election and was subsequently defeated by Republican challenger Olympia Snowe.

U.S. House of Representatives
Out of the 2 seats Maine is apportioned in the U.S. House of Representatives, both are held by Democrats:

Statewide officials
Democrats control the Governor's office, as well as the three statewide offices filled by the Maine Legislature:

Attorney General: Aaron Frey
State Treasurer: Henry Beck

State legislative leaders

Senate President: Troy Jackson
Senate Majority Leader: Eloise Vitelli
Assistant Senate Majority Leader: Mattie Daughtry
House Speaker: Rachel Talbot Ross

History

The Democratic Party has history dating back to the 1800s. Maine entered the Union in 1820 as an Anti-Federalist state. Soon after, in 1834, the Anti-Federalists adopted the Democratic Party name.

The Democrats had limited success for nearly a hundred years, in part due to slavery. The Northeast was predominantly anti-slavery whereas the South was pro-slavery. When the Whig party split in 1856, most of its northern wing formed the Republican Party, which dominated Maine due to its anti-slavery stance. Maine was predominantly Republican until 1954.

In 1954, in a gubernatorial election, Democratic state representative Edmund Muskie became only the fourth Democrat to win the governorship in the 20th century. He won the state over in part due to his stance on economic growth through industrial development, accessible politics on television and being acceptable to diverse population growth. Between 1954 and 1974, the number of registered Democrats more than doubled from 99,000 to 212,000.

In more recent years, Maine has been roughly evenly split between Democrats, Republicans, and independents. For instance in 1990, independent registered voters constituted 37% of the electorate, Democrats 33%, and Republicans 30%. This is a great contrast to the first hundred years of Maine politics.

Democrat Janet Mills was elected Governor of Maine in the 2018 gubernatorial election.

Party platform

Maine Democrats promote economic opportunity, ethical government, freedom, safety, and national security. They also promote voting rights, environmental protection, strong public education, access to health care, civil rights, transportation infrastructure, and help for those in serious poverty.

The party advocates economic security through strong support of Social Security, Medicare, and Medicaid.

Maine Democrats believe in fair workplace opportunities and support Maine workers' right to form unions through the Employee Free Choice Act, which gives employees the chance to strike without being punished by employers and also keeps the workplace free of hazards, harassment, and discrimination.

The platform also supports environmental protection through an energy plan to curb pollution and increase productivity.

Organizational structure
The Maine Democratic Party is governed by the Democratic State Committee.

Maine Democratic Party staff and operations:
Gaetan Davis: Executive Director
Megan Hyson: Development Director 
Tim Grose: Field Director 
Jacob Stern: Communications Director
Marc Malon: Party Affairs Director 
Dash Marley: Finance Director
Joe Haas: Data Director
Sean Smith: House Caucus Director
Lily Herrmann: Senate Caucus Director

Maine Democratic Party Officers:
Chair: Drew Gattine
Vice-Chair: Bev Uhlenhake
Secretary: Vicky Cohen
Treasurer: Betty Johnson
Assistant Treasurer: Jonathan Goble
DNC Member: BJ McCollister, Rachel Talbot Ross

See also
Political party strength in Maine

Notes

References

External links
 Maine Democratic Party

 
Democratic Party
Democratic Party (United States) by state